Exallias brevis, the leopard blenny, is a species of combtooth blenny found in coral reefs in the Pacific and Indian oceans.  This species reaches a length of  TL. This species can be found in the aquarium trade. It is the only known member of its genus.

References

External links
 

Salarinae
Monotypic fish genera
Fish described in 1868